KMBI-FM (107.9 MHz) is a non-profit radio station in Spokane, Washington.  It broadcasts a Christian talk and teaching radio format and is owned by the Moody Bible Institute of Chicago.  KMBI-FM serves as the flagship station of the Moody Radio Northwest network, serving Eastern Washington, Northeastern Oregon, Northern Idaho, Western Montana and Northwestern Wyoming.  The network holds periodic fundraisers on the air to support the broadcasts.

Local programming includes Dawn and Steve, a weekday morning program.  National religious leaders heard on KMBI-FM include John MacArthur, Jim Daly, Janet Parshall, David Jeremiah and Chuck Swindoll.

KMBI-FM's transmitter is off East Henry Road in Freeman, Washington.  It is one of seven local Spokane FM radio stations heard across Canada to subscribers of the Shaw Direct satellite TV service.

Repeater network

Translators

Defunct translators
 K207DC (89.3 MHz), Tonasket, Washington
 K280AP (103.9 MHz), Omak, Washington

References

External links
KMBI official website

MBI-FM
Moody Radio
MBI-FM
Radio stations established in 1968
1968 establishments in Washington (state)